Dhanu Jatra or Dhanu Yatra is an annual drama-based open air theatrical performance celebrated in Bargarh, Odisha. Spread across a 8 km radius area around the Bargarh municipality, it is world's largest open air theater, one that finds a mention in the Guinness Book of World Records. It is based on mythological story of Krishna (locally known as Krushna), and his demon uncle Kansa. Originating in Bargarh, in the present day play, the enactments of the play are being performed in many other places in Western Odisha. The major one of these is the original one at Bargarh. It is about the episode of Krishna and Balaram's visit to Mathura to witness the Dhanu ceremony organized by their (maternal) uncle Kansa. The plays start with the dethroning of emperor Ugrasena by the angry prince Kansa, over the marriage of his sister Debaki with Basudeba, and ends with death of Kansa, and Ugrasen restoring back to become the king. There is no written script used in these enactments. During this festival Kansa can punish people with penalty for their mistakes. Biju Patnaik, the former Chief Minister of Odisha was fined once along with his ministers. The department of Culture of the Government of India has accorded National Festival status to Dhanu Yatra on November 2014.

History

It is said by some old people that as a way to celebrate the freedom, of newly formed independent India after the British rulers, the labor class workers started this festival. Death of Kansa symbolised the end of colonial rules.

Venues
The main municipality area turns into the historical town of Mathura Nagari, river Jeera turns into Yamuna, Ambapaali village (now a ward - part of Bargarh municipality) becomes Gopapura. A Pond by the side of Jeera river in Ambapali becomes the Kalindi Lake of the mythology. Since 2005, Nishamani School Ground has been used as the Rangamahal - Cultural stage of the festival.

There are many other towns/ villages of western Odisha, where this drama enactment is done in recent years, following the success and popularity of the Bargarh stage. The notable places are village Chicholi of Ambabhona block is considered to be the second most famous in that area, apart from this Thuaapaali, Remanda are also notable.

Mathura
The daily vegetable market inside the heart of the town becomes the main stage of the festival. A temporary stage is built up using bamboo, cloth and other decorating materials. The cement concrete roof of market shops works as main platform. cultural troops, perform there in presence of King Kansa, invited guests and eager audience ranging from children to old people.

There is the historical place of starting point, at the rear area of the daily market, where the holy mast is erected a few days before the actual festival begins. Historically this place has been used by "Sanchaar" dance  form performers. It is a declining and going extinct form of dance. Only handful old performers of this dance form are left, who still come every year to perform. This dance goes on throughout the night to keep the visitors of the villages engaged with entertainment, question answers.

Gopapura
Nearby village Ambapaali is rendered as Gopapura, during the festival. Villagers paint their houses to the themes of the mythology, hand drawings on walls showing various stories of Krishna. Wall writing of poetic stanzas are quite common on almost all walls of the village.

Yamuna River
Jeera river, flowing on West side to the main town, is transformed into river Yamuna for these 10 days. The river is used in the drama in 3 days of the play -

 When Krishna is born and Vasudeva goes to leave Krishna, his son at king Nanda's place, for the safety from the killer hands of Kansa
 During Raas Leela of Krishna with Gopis along the banks of the river (Gopapura - Ambapaali)
 When minister Akrura goes and brings Krishna Balaram Brother duos to show them Dhanu jatra at Mathura (Bargarh) city.

Ashramas
Gobindpaali:

Year-wise prime actors
2009–2015 Dhanuyatra - Kansa- Hrushikes bhoi

Makeup artist Ghasiram Sahu of Bargarh, Odisha, actively associated with this festival since 1951 without a break, died at the age of 84 years on 31 July 2015. He is credited for giving unique tyrant look to Kanssa, the principal actor of this play.

Events that require a special mention

Known as the world's biggest open-air theatre, it is held at bargarh since 1947.

See also
 Festivals of Odisha
 Bargarh

References

Booklet brochure published by Dhanuyatra Mahotsav Samiti, Bargarh on the occasion of 65th year, from 6th Jan. 2014 till 16th Jan 2014.

External links
 Bargarh Dhanu Yatra, Official website
 Amar Dhanu Yatra Official App
 navratnanews.com: Dhanuyatra

Festivals in Odisha
Odia culture
January observances
December observances
Hindu festivals